The following article is a summary of the 2005–06 football season in Australia, which was the first season following the formation of the A-League.

A-League

The inaugural 2005–06 A-League season began on 26 August 2005 and ended on 5 March 2006.

Regular season

Finals series

A-League Pre-Season Challenge Cup

The inaugural 2005 A-League Pre-Season Challenge Cup began on 22 July 2005 and ended on 20 August 2005.

Group stage
Group A

Group B

Finals

Australian Club World Championship Qualifying Tournament

International club competititons

OFC Club Championship

The 2005 OFC Club Championship began on 31 May 2005 and ended on 10 June 2005. Sydney FC entered as winners of the 2005 Australian Club World Championship Qualifying Tournament.

FIFA Club World Championship

The 2005 FIFA Club World Championship ran from 11 to 18 December 2005. Sydney FC qualified as winners of the 2005 OFC Club Championship.

National teams

Men's senior

Friendlies
The following is a list of friendlies played by the men's senior national team in 2005–06.

FIFA World Cup qualification

Asian Cup qualification

FIFA World Cup

Men's under-23

Friendlies
The following is a list of friendlies played by the men's under-23 national team in 2005–06.

Men's under-20

Friendlies
The following is a list of friendlies played by the men's under-20 national team in 2005–06.

AFC Youth Championship qualification

Men's under-17

Friendlies
The following is a list of friendlies played by the men's under-17 national team in 2005–06.

FIFA U-17 World Championship

2006 AFC U-17 Championship qualification

Women's senior

Friendlies
The following is a list of friendlies played by the women's senior national team in 2005–06.

Women's under-20

Friendlies
The following is a list of friendlies played by the women's senior national team in 2005–06.

AFC U-19 Women's Championship qualification

AFC U-19 Women's Championship

Deaths
25 November 2005: George Best, Northern Ireland and Brisbane Lions midfielder.

References

External links
 Football Federation Australia official website

 
 
Seasons in Australian soccer
2005–06 in Australian women's soccer